Manila sound is a music genre in the Philippines that began in the mid-1970s in Manila. The genre flourished and peaked in the mid to late-1970s during the Philippine martial law era and has influenced most of the modern genres in the country by being the forerunner to OPM.

Characteristics
The Manila sound is styled as catchy and melodic, smooth, lightly orchestrated, accessible folk/soft rock, sometimes fused with funk, light jazz and disco. However, broadly speaking, it includes quite a number of genres (e.g. pop, vocal music, soft rock, folk pop, disco, soul, Latin jazz, funk etc.), and should therefore be best regarded as a period in Philippine popular music rather than as a single musical style. Manila sound typified the prevailing pop sound of the era, and drew its influences from the singer-songwriter genre of American music during the 1970s. A majority of Manila sound songs were composed in Tagalog or Taglish, although some were also written entirely in English. Sometimes, these songs included "juvenile lyrics", and less frequently, "swardspeak" (aka "gayspeak", i.e. homosexual slang) recast with novelty, comedic or satirical undertones.

History

The Manila sound was popularized by the pop rock band Hotdog with their many hit singles, including "Ikaw ang Miss Universe ng Buhay Ko" (You Are the Miss Universe of My Life), "Panaginip" (Dream), "Langit Na Naman" (Heaven Once Again), "O, Lumapit Ka" (Oh, Come Closer), "Bitin Sa Iyo" (Left Hanging Over You), and "Dying to Tell You", among others. The term "Manila sound" was used in the early Seventies to label pop music by young bands like Hotdog and Cinderella, and young singers who sang in Tagalog/Taglish and English, such as Rico J. Puno and Hadji Alejandro. The term was not derived from Hotdog's hit single "Manila", which was released much later in the decade, as some ascribe. In 1975, for example, Vicor Music Corporation released the album “The Manila Sound”.

Manila sound is characterized by catchy melodic phrases. In its later period, Manila sound was dominated by the disco mania that swept the Philippines, led by groups such as VST & Company, The Boyfriends and Hagibis, among others. Alternately described as "the marshmallow sound", Manila sound generated a string of calculated radio hits by artists such as Cinderella, Apolinario Mabini Hiking Society, Florante, Rico J. Puno, Sharon Cuneta, and many others.

Manila sound's unprecedented and meteoric appeal provided viability to a Philippine recording industry that until then had relied on cover versions and imitation of foreign hits to entice consumers. In the genre's later years, lyrics skewed towards camp humor and parody eventually caused Manila sound to devolve into an explicitly theatrical, if not juvenile, subgenre, as exemplified by Hagibis (a mimicry of the Village People) and The Boyfriends, until it diminished in the late 1970s under a wave of dance-oriented hits from American films such as Saturday Night Fever, Grease and Footloose. By the early 1980s, disco had waned in popularity, mirroring disco's serious backlash and decline that occurred earlier in the United States. Moreover, musical tastes had changed, moving away from soft rock into newer musical forms, particularly adult contemporary, and to a lesser extent punk rock and new wave, and radio airplay reflected these changes.

Manila sound's laid-back and unpretentious musical style gave way to the intricate, multi-layered, and sometimes symphonic arrangements of OPM (Original Pilipino Music) that dominated popular, radio-friendly Philippine music starting in the late 1970s until the early 2000s. OPM, spawned initially or heavily influenced by the annual Metro Manila Popular Music Festival, emerged as the radio favorites. Two of OPM's early and highly successful releases were the songs "Anak" by folk rock singer-songwriter Freddie Aguilar, along with "Kay Ganda ng Ating Musika" by pianist/composer/conductor Ryan Cayabyab. Both songs produced a new generation of Original Pilipino Music represented by artists such as Kuh Ledesma, Zsa Zsa Padilla, Basil Valdez, Gary Valenciano, Martin Nievera and, later, Regine Velasquez.

A resurgence in interest in Manila sound in recent years has yielded several compilation albums. In 2006, the Apo Hiking Society relaunched their retro hits in a double-CD package, coupled with reinterpretations of each by Manila's young alternative bands. Riding on the appeal of this revival, The Best of Manila Sound: Hopia Mani Popcorn was released the same year, featuring interpretations of a number of classic Manila sound hits. The Best of Manila Sound: Hopia Mani Popcorn 2 followed in 2008.

Artists

Hotdog: The brothers Dennis Garcia, Rene Garcia and Jess Garcia and their original discovery of a silk-voiced, affluently-bred Ella Del Rosario, created the legendary Hotdog band in the mid-'70s, a reconfiguration of an earlier band called Red Fox, which spawned what became known globally as the 'Manila sound'.

Crafting melodic, radio-megahit pop songs in a blend of homegrown Tagalog speak, combined with Ella del Rosario's exclusive upper crust Spanish-American upbringing and cool slang language, Hotdog etched an indelible mark in Philippine music history with multi-generational hits like "Pers Lab", "You Make Me Blush", "Manila", "Annie Batungbakal", "Bongga Ka, 'Day", "Ikaw ang Miss Universe ng Buhay Ko", "Ako'y Bitin Sa Iyo", "Langit na Naman", "Pers Lab 2", and "Behhh, Buti Nga", among many others. The band was instrumental in bringing the sound and quality of local pop music on par with international standards.

Baby Gil, Philippine Stars influential entertainment columnist, observed: "Hotdog, with Ella del Rosario's beautifully angelic voice streaming through the airwaves during the clangs of martial law, immediately killed colonial mentality in pop music with its phenomenal original music. Influenced largely by del Rosario's regal societal class and beauty, gated palatial upbringing, her Spanish-American roots, her uniquely tonal and sweetly charming international accent, combined with her private school upbringing, a magnetic charm, affluent mannerisms and English-speaking mannerisms, suddenly it was cool to talk Taglish and listen to a Pinoy pop band. But a decade before that, the current Filipino songs were 'God Knows' by Pablo Vergara and 'Sapagka't Kami ay Tao Lamang' by Tony Marquez that teen-aged music buyers would never be caught dead listening to."

The songs of Hotdog heavily influenced and sowed the seeds of Original Pilipino Music or OPM that was to later emerge in the late 1970s and into the 1980s. Also for the first time, local songs began to dominate the Philippine airwaves, club and disco music scenes, five-star hotel lobbies and lounges, food and retail malls, and even Philippine Airlines cabins arriving home from international flights (then monopolized by American pop and rock songs) and establish the style and identity of mainstream Filipino music. From the lowly farmers in the hinterland rice paddies to taxi drivers gaily plying city streets and the exclusively-rich colegialas (college girls) in private colleges and renowned universities, everyone was playing and singing Hotdog songs, glued to pop radio stations eagerly awaiting hit after hit by the band. Fans couldn't get enough of baby-faced beauty Ella Del Rosario, who quickly rose to mega stardom and was considered a beloved icon, especially pointed out as a national treasure by then First Lady Imelda Marcos. Fans flocked to personally attend del Rosario's TV shows, ticket sales increased with her movies and many named their female children after her. Since then, songs by Hotdog have been used in movies, television advertisements, radio commercials, videoke products, cellphone ringtones, and so forth.

In a nation of musically inclined citizens, Hotdog and Ella del Rosario's songs rank highest among the most recognized and revered. Del Rosario had a successful solo career when she was signed by Vicor and Canary labels. Hotdog and del Rosario's phenomenon paved the way for the solo musical careers of female pop singers. Del Rosario is considered the Pop, Samba and Disco Queen of the Philippines. Her solo career hits such as "O Lumapit Ka", "Mr. Disco", "Sabik na Sabik", "I Love You", including several hit advertising and commercial jingles, earned her the title of Manila Sound Queen. 
Others that followed were Zsa Zsa Padilla, Gina Montes and Maso Diez.VST and Company: Initially starting with the Sotto Brothers, the group scored a number of disco hits such as "Disco Fever", "Awitin Mo Isasayaw Ko", "Kiss Kiss", "Step No Step Yes", "Swing", "Tayo'y Magsayawan", and "Rock Baby Rock" along with romantic ballads like "Ikaw ang Aking Mahal" and "Ipagpatawad Mo". Currently, VST and Company has incorporated bossa nova influences in its music as evidenced by its album, The Bossa Nova Collection: VST and Company. The group also help launch the careers of some Filipino artists, particularly that of Sharon Cuneta.The Boyfriends: Famous for the song "Sumayaw, Sumunod" which became a big disco hit, they also released the disco songs "Araw-araw, Oras-oras" and "Dance with Me", and the love ballads "Nais Kong Malaman Mo", "First Love", and "Bakit Labis Kitang Mahal".Soul Jugglers: Funk band that released the singles "Hanggang Magdamag" and "Pinoy Disko".Cinderella: Pop band more commonly known for its love songs, particularly "T.L. Ako Sa'yo", "Bato Sa Buhangin", "Sa Aking Pag-iisa", "Ang Boyfriend kong Baduy", "May Crush Ako Sa 'Yo", "Pag-ibig Ko'y Ibang Iba", "Superstar ng Buhay Ko", and "Tulak Ng Bibig, Kabig Ng Dibdib". Cecile Colayco and the late Yolly Samson were lead vocalists. In its later output, Cinderella incorporated bossa nova in its repertoire, as exemplified in the album The Bossa Nova Collection: Cinderella.

The APO Hiking Society, composed of Danny Javier, Jim Paredes, and Boboy Garrovillo. Their albums were released from 1974 to early 2000, included many hit songs such as "When I Met You", "Panalangin", "Batang-Bata Ka Pa", "Yakap Sa Dilim", "Pumapatak Ang Ulan", "Ewan", "Awit Ng Barkada", "Mahirap Magmahal Ng Syota Ng Iba", "Paano", "Pag-ibig", "Nakapagtataka", "Show Me A Smile", "Blue Jeans", "Tuyo Na'ng Damdamin", "Kumot At Unan", "Kaibigan", "Sa'n Na Nga Ba'ng Barkada Ngayon", and "Doo Bi Doo". APO started out as a large high school vocal group at the Ateneo de Manila High School but was later reduced to a trio consisting of Danny, Jim, and Boboy, which achieved great success during the 1980s, 1990s and 2000s, as Danny Javier coined the term OPM or Original Pilipino Music in the late-70's. In December 2009, APO announced its plans for retiring from active performance, citing "diminished creative processes". After a series of warmly-received concerts in February to May 2010, the group officially retired. Kami nAPO Muna, a tribute album, is a latter-day release.Sampaguita: Folk rock band renowned for the hit singles "Laguna", "Bonggahan", "Tao" and "Nosi Ba Lasi", among other songs.Hagibis: Members were Sonny Parsons, Bernie Fineza, Mike Respall, Joji Garcia, and Mon Picazo. Song-and-dance male group known for its disco hits "Katawan", "Lalake", "Legs", "Nanggigigil Ako", "Babae", and "Ilagay Mo Kid". The group's musical and performing style nearly parallels that of the American disco group the Village People.Rey Valera: Pop artist and singer-songwriter known for releasing a string of romantic ballads including "Di Mo Pansin", "Kamusta Ka", "Kung Kailangan Mo Ako", "Maging Sino Ka Man", "Malayo Pa ang Umaga", "Naalaala Ka", "Pangako Sa Iyo", "Kung Tayo'y Magkalayo", and "Kahit Maputi Na ang Buhok Ko", among others. He made his first appearance in music with the group Electric Hair Band.Sharon Cuneta: Pop singer/screen actress who started her musical career as a twelve-year-old in 1978 when she released a Rey Valera composition entitled "Mr. DJ". She also recorded a cover version of "I-swing Mo Ako", which was a VST & Co. original release.  Two other singles, "Kahit Maputi Na ang Buhok Ko" (another Rey Valera composition) and "High School Life" also received considerable airplay. She later successfully crossed over into OPM, retaining and even increasing her commercial appeal.Florante: Folk-pop artist who recorded the inspirational song, "Handog". He is also known for the hit songs "Ako'y Isang Pinoy", "ABaKaDa", "Pinay", and "Sana".Rico J. Puno: Soul balladeer acclaimed for a number of hit songs, including "Lupa", "Damdamin", "May Bukas Pa", "Kapalaran", "Macho Gwapito", "Sorry Na Puede Ba", and "Diyos ang Pag-ibig", among many others. After the collapse of Manila sound, he remained popular with the emergent OPM (Original Pilipino Music) genre. He was likewise famed for recasting American pop songs (e.g. "The Way We Were") with Tagalog lyrics with the aim of reaching a bigger sector of the listening public.

Other artists/bands that contributed to Manila sound include ABC Express ("Magandang Binibini (I Love You)"), Asin ("Itanong Mo Sa Mga Bata"), Azul ("O Pag-ibig"), Blue Jeans ("Paniwalaan"), Bong Peñera and the Batucada ("Samba Song"), Celeste Legaspi ("Saranggola ni Pepe", "Mamang Sorbetero", "Tuliro", "Gaano Kita Kamahal"), Jose Mari Chan ("Good Old-fashioned Romance", "Here & Now"), Juan Dela Cruz Band ("Maskara", "Beep Beep") Ella del Rosario ("Mr. Disco", "Lagi Na Lamang", "Shake It Baby"), Fred Panopio ("Ang Kawawang Cowboy", "Bilmoko", "Pitong Gatang"), Junior ("Yakap"), Labuyo ("Tuloy Pa Rin"), Pat Castillo ("Aso't Pusa"), Rainmakers ("Binibini", "OK Sa Akin", "You and Me", "Miss Maganda"), Singsing ("Usapan", "Oh Babe"), Tito Mina ("Ikaw Pa Rin", "Honey", "Got to Let You Know", "Both in Love"), and Wadab ("Pag Tumatagal Lalong Tumitibay", "Iniibig Kita").

Record labels
Villar Records (Mareco Broadcasting Network, Inc.), Alpha Records and Vicor Music Philippines (and its subsidiary imprints, Sunshine Records and Blackgold Records) were recording companies that pioneered Manila sound.

Cover versions
Over the years since Manila sound's decline, many performers have released cover versions of the more popular songs of this genre, indicating its continuing appeal to new generations of listeners. These artists and their covers include Barbie's Cradle ("Langit Na Naman"), Donna Cruz ("Boy"), Erik Santos ("Bitin Sa Iyo"), Freestyle ("Bakit Ba Ganyan"), Gary Valenciano ("Manila"), Janno Gibbs ("Binibini", "Ipagpatawad"), Jolina Magdangal ("T.L. Ako Sa Iyo"), Mark Bautista ("Beh Buti Nga" (feat. Anne Curtis)), Manilyn Reynes ("Mr. Disco", "Shake It Baby", "Nais Kong Malaman Mo" (with Keempee de Leon)), Prettier Than Pink ("Ang Boyfriend Kong Baduy"), Piolo Pascual (Ms. Universe), Sarah Geronimo ("Pers Lab"), Sheryn Regis ("Bongga Ka Day"), Sitti Navarro ("Samba Song"), Tina Paner ("Sana"), Vina Morales ("Pers Lab"), and White Lies ("First Love Never Dies").

Resurgence
In 2005, the Filipino funk band Kala appeared in the music scene with its retro-sounding first single, "Jeepney", which became a major hit. According to the Philippine Inquirer, the band revived and redefined the Manila sound genre through their funk-rock-hip music. Rene Garcia (co-founder of the band Hotdog) praised Kala by "carrying out the funky groove of the 1970s with the sounds of today". The multi-awarded band also took part in the tribute album, Hopia Mani Popcorn. Kala's funky cover version of VST and Co.'s "Rock Baby Rock" became a hit.

The resurgence, rediscovery, and remodeling of the Manila sound is a boost to the Philippine music industry.

New Manila sound and new OPMNew Manila sound and new OPM' are terms coined to distinguish new songs that follow the Manila sound style from those made in the 1970s and 1980s. Songs in this category are not remakes and are currently circulating in the independent music movement, mainly on the Internet, through the fledgling group SongwritersPh. The label IndiePinoy is one of the few independent labels that have released new songs mostly without the benefit of radio and television media exposure, but through alternative distribution means such as online and mobile downloads. The same group also created RadioPilipinas.com in 2008, and was touted to be the first Philippine-based Internet radio that aired OPM and alternative music, when local FM radio stations had changed format and programming.

References

 
Disco
Philippine popular music
Folk rock
Music of Metro Manila